Gregory Kellam Scott (July 30, 1948 – March 31, 2021) was an associate justice of the Colorado Supreme Court from 1993 to 2000.

Scott received his J.D. from Indiana University. He moved to Denver, Colorado, in 1977 to take a position with the U.S. Securities and Exchange Commission. He was appointed by Governor Roy Romer to the Colorado Supreme Court in 1992, taking office on January 15, 1993. He resigned on March 15, 2000, to accept a position as vice president and general counsel of Kaiser-Hill LLC.

Scott died at his home in Anderson, Indiana, at the age of 72.

References

1948 births
2021 deaths
20th-century American judges
21st-century American judges
African-American judges
Justices of the Colorado Supreme Court
Indiana University Maurer School of Law alumni
U.S. Securities and Exchange Commission personnel
20th-century African-American people
21st-century African-American people